Kenz is a railway station in the village of Kenz-Küstrow, Mecklenburg-Vorpommern, Germany. The station lies on the Velgast-Barth railway and the train services are operated by Deutsche Bahn.

Train services
The station is served by the following service:

 regional service  (DB Regio Nordost) Barth - Kenz - Saatel - Velgast

References

Railway stations in Mecklenburg-Western Pomerania
Railway stations in Germany opened in 1928